Bailey's Comets is an animated cartoon series that aired on CBS. The second season consisted entirely of reruns. The series was produced by DePatie-Freleng Enterprises and was created by David H. DePatie and Friz Freleng in association with Joe Ruby and Ken Spears.

Plot
Different roller skating teams compete in a worldwide race to different locations searching for clues that will lead them to a million-dollar prize at the end of the race. Besides the teams interfering with each other, there were also outside forces and subplots that would step in to hinder the teams' progress.

Characters

Bailey's Comets
The protagonists and the team presented as most likely to win the million-dollar prize were a group of teenagers called Bailey's Comets. This team consisted of:

 Barnaby Bailey (voiced by Carl Esser) - the handsome, youthful leader of the team. He is the one who generally calls the shots and has to (reluctantly) take the most risks.
 Candy (voiced by Karen Smith) - a pretty blonde-haired girl. She is presumably Barnaby's girlfriend as she is the one who pushes him to take risks when necessary.
 Sarge (voiced by Kathy Gori in a Brooklyn accent) - a red-haired girl who was the team motivator.
 Wheelie (voiced by Jim Begg) - the team mechanic who comes up with strange roller skate-based inventions.
 Bunny (voiced by Sarah Kennedy) - a sweet-natured, yet very ditzy girl.
 Pudge (voiced by Frank Welker) - good-natured but prone to trouble; he was on the hefty side, yet had almost no difficulty keeping up with the rest of the team. Pudge was especially fond of bananas, prompting Wheelie to refer to him as "Banana Brain" whenever Pudge made a mistake.

Other teams
Bailey's Comets were constantly being hindered by the other skating teams who also interfere with one another. The other skating teams consist of:

 The Texas Black Hats - a group of outlaw cowboys that rode on roller skate-wearing horses. They are led by an unnamed outlaw (voiced by Daws Butler).
 The Jekyll-Hydes - a group of top hat-wearing English doctors that would turn into hideous green-skinned creatures at the most inopportune times that are led by Henry (voiced by Don Messick). Their "Jekyll" forms resembled Roland from the Roland and Ratfink theatrical shorts.
 The Ramblin' Rivets - a team consisting of a professor (voiced by Daws Butler) and his robots named Scrappy, Boltsbucket, and Fenderbender. The robots each contained all sorts of mechanical contraptions to help their team advance in the race.
 The Duster Busters - a motorcycle gang. They skated in half-sitting positions as if they were mounted on motorcycles.
 The Roller Coasters - a circus-based team consisting of a ringmaster (voiced by Don Messick), Hercules the Strongman, Big Bertha the Fat Lady, a lion on roller-skates, a clown that rides on a lion, and an Indian Rubber Man.
 The Stone Rollers - a team consisting of three roller-skating cavemen (all voiced by Bob Holt) and their roller-skating dinosaur (vocal effects provided by Don Messick).
 The Cosmic Rays - a team consisting of four aliens inside a skating flying saucer.
 The Gargantuan Giants - literally, a giant football team, so huge that only their skates would be seen onscreen. They were led by a normal-sized coach (voiced by Don Messick) who rode on the skates of one of the other members of his team.
 The Rockin' Rollers - a rock band.
 The Broomer Girls - a team of witches on roller skate-equipped brooms that are led by Auntie Hag. They also had a snickering roller-skating cat on their team.
 The Roller Bears - a team of five roller-skating bears which consist of four bears and one bear cub. They were the most hapless of the teams as they are constantly blundering and always laughing like idiots no matter how badly things got.
 The Mystery Mob - a team of skaters that are constantly immersed in a huge cloud of dust with flailing arms and legs. Despite being a skate team, no one knows what they look like.
 The Yo Ho-Ho's - a team of pirates led by a William Bligh-type pirate captain (voiced by Daws Butler). They use a roller skate-equipped raft. One pirate rows, another pirate serves as the mast by holding a sail, and the other rides in a roller skate-equipped barrel attached to the raft.
 The Hairy Mountain Red Eyes - a family of hillbillies. Pa (voiced by Don Messick) rode in a roller skate-equipped wash bucket. Ma carried a hoe, and there were two boys consisting of Cornball and another one who carried a pig.

Commentators
There were also two commentators named Gabby (voiced by Frank Welker impersonating Howard Cosell) and Dooter Roo (voiced by Daws Butler) keeping constant track of the proceedings from a helicopter. Very rarely, however, did they ever get involved in the actual goings-on of the race.

Cast
 Jim Begg as Wheelie
 Daws Butler as Dooter Roo, Pirate Captain, Professor, Texas Black Hats Leader
 Carl Esser as Barnaby Bailey
 Kathy Gori as Sarge
 Bob Holt as Dude, Stone Rollers
 Sarah Kennedy as Bunny
 Don Messick as Henry, Gargantuan Giants' Coach, Ringmaster, Stone Rollers' Dinosaur, Pa Redeye
 Karen Smith as Candy
 Frank Welker as Pudge, Gabby, Duster Busters Member, Grog of the Yo Ho-Hos

Episodes

Production credits
 Created for Television: David H. DePatie, Friz Freleng
 In Association with Ken Spears, Joe Ruby
 Writers: Dalton Sandifer, John W. Dunn, Larz Bourne
 Animation Directors: Bob McKimson, Sid Marcus
 Storyboard Directors: Arthur Leonardi, Cullen Houghtaling
 Layout Supervision and Design: Cullen Houghtaling
 Layouts: Martin Studler, Owen Fitzgerald, Bob Givens, Glenn Schmitz, Ric Gonzales, Dick Ung
 Animation: Don Williams, Bill Carney, Ken Muse, Norm McCabe, Bob Richardson, Bill Ackerman, John Gibbs, Ken Walker, Bob Matz, John Freeman, Reuben Timmins, Bob Kirk, Bob Bemiller
 Background Supervised by Richard H. Thomas, Mary O'Loughlin
 Ink and Paint Supervisor: Gertrude Timmins
 Xerography: Paul B. Strickland
 Film Editing Supervised by Rick Steward
 Film Editors: Joe Siracusa, Jim Blodgett, Allan R. Potter
 Voice Talents of: Don Messick, Bob Holt, Sarah Kennedy, Daws Butler, Carl Esser, Kathy Gori, Karen Smith, Jim Begg, Frank Welker
 Title Design by Arthur Leonardi
 Music by Doug Goodwin
 Music Score Conducted by Eric Rogers
 Title Song Sung by "Every Thing Under the Sun"
 In Charge of Production: Lee Gunther
 Camera: Ray Lee, Larry Hogan, John Burton Jr.
 Production Mixer: Steve Orr
 Sound by Producers' Sound Service, Inc.
 Associate Producers: Joe Ruby, Ken Spears
 Produced by David H. DePatie, Friz Freleng

References

External links
 Bailey's Comets at Internet Movie Database
 
 Retrô TV 

1970s American animated television series
1973 American television series debuts
1975 American television series endings
American children's animated comedy television series
American children's animated sports television series
CBS original programming
Teen animated television series
Television series by DePatie–Freleng Enterprises
Television series created by Joe Ruby
Television series created by Ken Spears